Harry Wilson may refer to:

Sports
 Harry Wilson (American football coach), coach at Buchtel College, active 1896
 Harry Wilson (halfback) (1902–1990), American football, basketball, and lacrosse player
 Harry Wilson (hurdler) (1896–1979), New Zealand track and field athlete
 Harry Wilson (Northamptonshire cricketer) (1897–1960)
 Harry Wilson (Worcestershire cricketer) (1873–1906)
 Harry Wilson (rugby league), English rugby league footballer who played in the 1890s and 1900s
 Harry Wilson (rugby union) (born 1999), Australian rugby union player
 Harry Wilson (Australian footballer) (1885–1972), Australian rules footballer with South Melbourne
 Harry Wilson (footballer, born 1896), Irish footballer
 Harry Wilson (footballer, born 1897), English footballer
 Harry Wilson (footballer, born 1953), English footballer
 Harry Wilson (footballer, born 1997), Welsh international footballer
 Harry Wilson (Scottish footballer), Scottish footballer (Partick Thistle)

Others
 Harry Wilson (actor) (1897–1978), English-born American character actor
 Harry Wilson (businessman) (born 1971), member of the auto industry task force, former financial executive
 Harry Wilson (politician) (1869–1948), American politician in Louisiana
 Harry L. Wilson (born 1957), professor of political science at Roanoke College
 Harry Leon Wilson (1867–1939), American novelist and dramatist
 H. Neill Wilson (1855–1927), architect

See also
 Harold Wilson (disambiguation)
 Henry Wilson (disambiguation)
 Harrison Wilson, 90210 character
 Harry Willson (1932–2010), American writer